KHBA-LD, virtual and UHF digital channel 35, is a low-powered Hope Channel-affiliated television station licensed to Spokane, Washington, United States. Founded on June 1, 1992, the station is owned by the He's Alive Broadcasting Association subsidiary of the Upper Columbia Conference of Seventh-day Adventists. The station broadcasts from a transmitter located atop Krell Hill, southeast of Spokane.

History
The station received its original construction permit as K63EX from the FCC on June 1, 1992. Originally owned by Browne Mountain Television, it began broadcasting on December 7, 1993 on UHF channel 63 and was licensed on January 4, 1994. Browne Mountain Television sold the station to He's Alive Broadcasting Association on June 23, 1995 and K63EX became an affiliate of 3ABN - Three Angels Broadcasting Network. The station took the call letters KHBA-LP on June 21, 1996, reflecting station ownership and in August 2003, KHBA moved from channel 63 to channel 52. In July 2006, needing to vacate the 700 MHz band, the station moved from channel 52 to channel 39 and was licensed for operation on channel 39 on January 16, 2007. In December 2008, KHBA was the first low power TV station to convert to digital in Spokane, and its designation was changed to KHBA-LD. KHBA-LD now broadcasts four distinct channels, airing The Hope Channel on 35.1, 3ABN on 35.2, Open Book TV on 35.3, and 3ABN's Dare to Dream network on 35.4.

External links
KHBA-LD official website

Adventist Review article about Open Book TV
Open Book TV website

Three Angels Broadcasting Network
HBA-LD
Low-power television stations in the United States
Television channels and stations established in 1992